Lelio Brancaccio (died 1599) was a Roman Catholic prelate who served as Archbishop of Taranto (1574–1599) and Archbishop of Sorrento (1571–1574).

Biography
On 20 June 1571, Lelio Brancaccio was appointed during the papacy of Pope Pius V as Archbishop of Sorrento.
On 15 November 1574, he was appointed during the papacy of Pope Gregory XIII as Archbishop of Taranto.
He served as Archbishop of Taranto until his death in 1599.

References

External links and additional sources
 (for Chronology of Bishops) 
 (for Chronology of Bishops)  

16th-century Roman Catholic archbishops in the Kingdom of Naples
Bishops appointed by Pope Pius V
Bishops appointed by Pope Gregory XIII
1599 deaths